Avalon School may refer to:

 Avalon Public School, Orleans, Ontario, Canada
 Avalon School, Avalon, New Zealand
 Avalon Intermediate School, Avalon, New Zealand
 Avalon School (California), United States
 The Avalon School, Maryland, United States
 Avalon School District, Avalon, New Jersey, United States
 Avalon School (Minnesota), United States
 Avalon High School, Avalon, Texas, United States

See also
 Avalon Elementary School (disambiguation)